Michele is an Italian male given name, akin to the English male name Michael.

Michele (usually pronounced  ), is also an English female given name that is derived from the French Michèle. It is a variant spelling of the more common (and identically pronounced) name Michelle. It can also be a surname.

Both are ultimately derived from the Latin biblical archangel Michael, original Hebrew name , meaning "Who is like God?".

Men with the given name Michele
Michele (singer) (born 1944), Italian pop singer
Michele Abruzzo (1904–1996), Italian actor
Michele Alboreto (1956–2001), Italian Grand Prix racing driver
Michele Amari (1806–1889), Italian politician and historian
Michele Andreolo (1912–1981), Italian footballer
Michele Bianchi (1883–1930), Italian journalist and revolutionary
Michele Bravi (born 1994), Italian singer
Michele Cachia (1760–1839), Maltese architect and military engineer
Michele Canini (born 1985), Italian footballer
Michele Dell'Orco (born 1985), Italian politician
Michele Emiliano (born 1959), Italian politician and former judge
Michele Ferrero (1925–2015), Italian businessman, owner of chocolate maker Ferrero SpA
Michele Greco (1924–2008), Sicilian mafioso
Mikelangelo (Michele) Loconte (born 1973), Italian musician and author
Michele Monti (1970–2018), Italian judoka
Michele Morrone (born 1990), Italian actor
Michele Paolucci (born 1986), Italian footballer
Michele Pasinato (1969–2021), Italian volleyball player
Michele De Pietro (1884–1967), Italian lawyer and politician
Michele Placido (born 1946), Italian actor
Michele Rüfenacht (born 1959), Swiss decathlete
Michele Santoro (born 1951), Italian anchorman/journalist
Michele Scarponi (1979–2017), Italian professional bicyclist
Michele Sepe (born 1986), Italian rugby union player
Michele Serra (born 1954), Italian writer and journalist
Michele Sindona (1920–1986), Italian banker
Michele Soavi (born 1957), Italian film director

Women with the given name Michele
Michèle Alliot-Marie (born 1946), French politician
Michele Amas (1961–2016), New Zealand actress, playwright and poet
Michèle Artigue (born 1946), French mathematics educator
Michèle Audin (born 1954), French mathematician
Michele Bachmann (born 1956), United States Representative from Minnesota
Michele Baldwin (1966-2012) also known as Lady Ganga, stand up paddled 700 miles down the Ganges River to raise awareness of Cervical Cancer
Michele Di Menna (born 1980), Canadian artist
Michele Dotrice (born 1948), English actress of Some Mothers Do 'Ave 'Em fame
Michele Elliott, British author, psychologist, teacher and the founder child protection charity Kidscape
Michele K. Evans, American internist and medical oncologist
Michèle Lalonde (1937–2021), Canadian dramatist, essayist, playwright and poet
Michele Lee (born 1942), American actress
Michele MacNaughton (born 1973), South African field hockey player
Michèle Magny (born 1944), Canadian actress, playwright, and director
Michele Merkin (born 1975),  American model and television host
Michele Meyer, American politician
Chrisette Michele Payne, known as Chrisette Michele, American neo-soul singer
Lea Michele Sarfati, known as Lea Michele (born 1986), American actress
Michele Mitchell (born 1962), American diver
Michèle Mouton (born 1951), French former rally driver
Michèle Plomer (born 1965), Canadian writer and translator
Michèle Renouf (born 1946), Australian socialite and Holocaust denier 
Michele Romanow (born 1985), Canadian entrepreneur
Michèle Rosier (1930–2017), French director, screenwriter, and fashion designer
Michele Scarabelli (born 1955), Canadian actress
Michèle Sebag, French computer scientist
Michèle Stephenson, Haitian filmmaker and former human rights attorney
Michele Tafoya, American sports journalist
Michele Timms (born 1965), Australian basketball player
Michele Waagaard (born 1980), Thai model, singer and radio host
Michele Zappavigna (born 1978), Australian linguist

Surname
Alessandro Michele, Italian fashion designer
Draya Michele, American media personality
Michael Michele, American actress
Riki Michele, American singer

See also
Michelle (name)
Michelle (disambiguation)

Surnames
French feminine given names
English feminine given names
Italian masculine given names
English-language surnames
Swiss feminine given names